Christine Sommer (born 1970) is an Austrian actress.

Life and career
Born in Vienna, Sommer completed her training as an actress in the years 1986 to 1990 at the Max Reinhardt Seminar. This was followed by engagements at various theaters in Vienna, Tübingen, Braunschweig, and at the Ruhr Festival in Recklinghausen. On television, she appeared in Inspector Rex and SOKO Wismar, among other series.

From March 2009 to February 2010, Sommer was in the ZDF telenovela Alisa – Folge deinem Herzen as Cornelia "Connie" Hundt.

Sommer lives with her partner, actor Martin Brambach, daughters, and son in Recklinghausen.

References

External links 
 

1970 births
Living people
Actresses from Vienna
Austrian stage actresses
Austrian film actresses
Austrian television actresses